Mlađa Veselinović (21 April 1915 – 27 December 2012) was a Serbian actor and translator.

Biography 
Veselinovic was born in Kragujevac, Serbia.  He was a member of the Yugoslav Drama Theatre from its founding in 1947, and made his début in the theater play "King Betajnove". He has collaborated with the biggest names and directing made about what the role on the stage of the Yugoslav Drama Theater. He acted in the films The Magic Sword (1950), La tempesta (1950), Professor Kosta Vujic's Hat (1972), Otpisani (1974).  He died on 27 December 2012, at the age of 97, in Belgrade.

Veselinović married fellow Serbian actress Branka Veselinović on 30 September 1948, and they remained married until his death.

Sources

External links 
 

1915 births
2012 deaths
20th-century Serbian male actors
Serbian translators
Actors from Kragujevac
Serbian male stage actors
Serbian male film actors
20th-century translators